World Championships have been held in the Smooth section of ballroom dancing since they were organised by the National Dance Council of America in 2005. 

American Smooth dancing covers the dances waltz, tango, foxtrot, and Viennese waltz.

World Champions

See also 
Standard World Champions
Latin World Champions
Rhythm World Champions
U.S. National Dancesport Champions (Professional Smooth)
U.S. National Dancesport Champions (Professional 9-Dance)

References

External links
National Dance Council of America

Dancesport